Scholastic may refer to:
 a philosopher or theologian in the tradition of scholasticism
 Scholastic (Notre Dame publication)
 Scholastic Corporation, an American publishing company of educational materials
 Scholastic Building, in New York City
 Jan I the Scholastic (14th c. AD), Duke of Oświęcim

See also
 Scholar (disambiguation)
 School (disambiguation)
 Applied Scholastics, U.S. Scientology non-profit corporation
 Neo-Scholasticism (Neo-Thomism) from the methods of St. Thomas of Aquinas
 Scholarism (學民思潮) Hong Kong political movement
 Scholarly method
 Scholasticism